Breathnach or Bhreathnach (meaning Welshman) is an Irish surname, indicating an ancestor who was Welsh. It is the Irish-language version of surnames such as Brannagh, Brunnock, Brannick, Walsh, Wallace, and Wallis.

However, it does not necessarily mean that the ancestor concerned was from modern-day Wales; Robert Bell notes that Wallace was a surname indicating a Briton native of Strathclyde or any part of the Latin name Wallensis meant just that. It can also refer to the Cambro-Normans (later Hiberno-Normans) that were of Norman origin, but came to Ireland via Wales. The name appears in twelfth-century records of Ayrshire and Renfrewshire, parts of the old Strathclyde kingdom ... Wallace has also been used as a synonym of Walsh." (Bell, p. 244). The best known bearer of the name from the area was Uilleam Breatnach (William Wallace).

John de Courcy (1160–1219) planted significant numbers of Britons of Cumbria during his lordship of Ulster. Gaelic-Irish sources such as Dubhaltach MacFhirbhisigh concur, referring to such people as breatnaigh, denoting a Briton (see Old Welsh) (Medieval Ireland, p. 514).

Bearers of the name
 Breandán Breathnach, music collector and uilleann piper
 Cárthach Bán Breathnach, actor and DJ
 Cormac Breathnach, teacher and politician
 Edel Bhreathnach, academic and historian
 Deasún Breathnach, writer and journalist
 Fiachra Breathnach, Gaelic Athletic Association (GAA) sportsperson
 Gearóidín Bhreathnach, sean-nós singer
 Lucilita Bhreatnach, Sinn Féin politician
 Maire Breathnach, actress
 Máire Breatnach, musician and educator
 Mícheál Breathnach (1881-1908), writer
 Micheál Breathnach (1886-after 1954), educator and writer
 Niamh Bhreathnach, Irish Labour Party politician
 Paddy Breathnach, film director and producer
 Pádraic Breathnach, actor and producer
 Seán Bán Breathnach, radio and television personality
 Séanna Breathnach, Provisional Irish Republican Army and Sinn Féin member
 Séamus Breathnach, Lab analyst

See also
 Míchael Breathnach GAC, a Gaelic Athletic Association club
 Bhreathnach

References
 The Book of Ulster Surnames, Robert Bell, 1988. 
 Walsh:Breathnach, Dáithí Ó hÓgáin, Gill & Macmillan, Dublin, 2003
 Welsh Influence in Medieval Ireland:An Encyclopedia (2005), ed. Seán Duffy, p. 514.

External links
 http://www.irishtimes.com/ancestor/surname/index.cfm?fuseaction=Go.&UserID=
 http://www.irishtimes.com/ancestor/surname/index.cfm?fuseaction=Go.&Surname=Walsh&UserID=

Surnames
Irish families
Irish-language surnames
Surnames of Irish origin
Surnames of British Isles origin